The White Spot / Delta Road Race  is a professional one day cycling race held annually in Canada. It is part of UCI America Tour in category 1.2.

Winners

References

Cycle races in Canada
UCI America Tour races
Recurring sporting events established in 2001
2001 establishments in Canada